Government English School may refer to:

 SMK King George V, Seremban
 Sultan Abdul Hamid College, Alor Star